Dolores Rousse (August 17, 1901 – December 16, 1985) was an American film actress who performed under the name Gloria Roy later in her career.

Career 
In May 1922, it was reported that Rousse would appear in Ziegfeld Follies after she won a newspaper beauty contest.

Her first film was No Mother to Guide Her (1923). The Plain Speaker wrote, "Another prominent actress in the photodrama is Dolores Rousse, who was with the Follies previous to her first screen appearance in No Mother to Guide Her. Her work in this picture gained her a contract and a leading part in other Fox productions".

Variety noted her performance in Against All Odds (1924), calling her character a "rather an insipid heroine, possibly because the love interest is never emphasized to any appreciable degree".

The Ukiah Dispatch Democrat wrote of her performance in Oh, You Tony!: "Dolores is not only an actress, but if she came on the stage with the lights turned off, the audience would think that she carried her own spotlight--this child sends forth an aura of light in the brilliance of her beauty".

Variety wrote the following about her performance in Thunder in the Night (1935): "Gloria Roy, girl who murdered her would-be blackmailer out of unrequited love, isn't in the footage as much as others, but gives a good account of herself while there."

She appeared in films in the Charlie Chan series and in the Mr. Moto series.

Partial filmography

Credited as Dolores Rousse 
 No Mother to Guide Her (1923) as Kathleen Pearson
 Ladies to Board (1924) as Model
 The Trouble Shooter (1924) as Chiquita
 Dark Stairways (1924) as Madge Armstrong
 Against All Odds (1924)  as Judy Malone
 Oh, You Tony! (1924) as The Countess
 Troubles of a Bride (1924) as Vera
 The Burning Trail (1925) as Esther Ramsey (credited as Dolores Roussey)

Credited as Gloria Roy 
 Hot Pepper (1933) as Lily
 Charlie Chan's Greatest Case (1933) as Arlene Compton
 Jimmy and Sally (1933) as Shirley
 Wild Gold (1934) as one of the Golden Girls
 Life Begins at 40 (1935) as Girl (uncredited)
 Asegure a su mujer (1935)
 Charlie Chan in Paris (1935) as Minor Part (uncredited)
 Charlie Chan in Egypt (1935) as Bit Girl (uncredited)
 Thunder in the Night (1935) as Katherine Szabo
 This Is the Life (1935) as Diane Revier
 Charlie Chan's Secret (1936) as Carlotta
 Song and Dance Man (1936) as Dolores
 Charlie Chan at the Race Track (1936) as Catherine Chester
 Crack-Up (1936) as Operative #16
 The Holy Terror (1937) as Maria Blair
 The Great Hospital Mystery (1937) as Nurse (uncredited)
 Charlie Chan on Broadway (1937) as Hat Check Girl (uncredited)
 Fair Warning (1937) as Grace Hamilton
 Mr. Moto's Gamble (1938) as Doctor
 Mr. Moto Takes a Chance (1938) as Keema
 Mr. Moto on Danger Island (1939) as Nurse
 Charlie Chan at Treasure Island (1939) as Plane Passenger (uncredited)
 The Grapes of Wrath (1940) as waitress (uncredited)
 Charlie Chan in Panama (1940) as Hostess (uncredited)

References

External links 

1901 births
1985 deaths
American actresses